Kalihi station is a planned Honolulu Rail Transit station in Honolulu, Hawaii. It is part of the fourth HART segment, scheduled to open in 2031.

The Hawaiian Station Name Working Group proposed Hawaiian names for the twelve rail stations on the eastern end of the rail system (stations in the Airport and City Center segments) in April 2019. The proposed name for this station, Mokauea, is derived from an ancient place name and refers to the largest island off the Kalihi ahupuaʻa.

References

External links
 

Honolulu Rail Transit stations
Railway stations scheduled to open in 2031